Charles Bufe, better known as Chaz Bufe, is a contemporary American anarchist author. Bufe primarily writes on the problems faced by the modern anarchist movement (as in his pamphlet "Listen, Anarchist!"), and also on atheism, music theory and intentional community.

Life
Chaz Bufe is principally known as an anarchist publisher, distributor and occasional author.  Originally from Arizona, he was influenced by the anarchist magazine The Match! published by Fred Woodworth in Tucson, AZ. In the early 1980s, he moved to the San Francisco Bay Area to enroll in the music department at the University of California (Berkeley), from which he received a master's degree in January 1985.  He became a member of the anarchist Bound Together Bookstore Collective in San Francisco. He also acted as the East Bay distributor of Processed World, a magazine which claimed to be written by and for "dissident office workers."  It described itself as anti-authoritarian, but became controversial for its alleged lack of internal democracy and overreactions to criticism. After failing to persuade Bound Together to ban a publication by Processed World critic Bob Black, Bufe resigned from the collective, later writing "Listen, Anarchist!", an attack on his political enemies. Anarchists Brian Kane and Lawrence Jarach replied with their own pamphlet, "Hold Your Tongue, Demagogue."

After receiving his degree, Bufe founded See Sharp Press in 1984 and then relocated to Tucson, Arizona. Some See Sharp publications are reprints of classical anarchist texts.  Others are by Bufe himself, mostly music instruction/reference works and atheist titles, including a critique of Alcoholics Anonymous and two pamphlets on ideas about a future anarchist or utopian society.  One was "A Future Worth Living: Thoughts on Getting There" (1998), which reveals the influence of the German New Age commune ZEGG. Bufe returned to the utopian theme in Design Your Own Utopia (2004), co-authored by "Doctress Neutopia" (Libby Hubbard, from the ZEGG commune) which mostly consisted of a questionnaire addressed to would-be utopians.

Bufe has written several hundred aphorisms under the pseudonym "Robert Tefton" which appear in an anthology he edited, "The Heretics's Handbook of Quotations" (self-published in 1998, and in an expanded edition in 2001).  Its model is The Devil's Dictionary by Ambrose Bierce. Bufe has released a volume, The Devil's Dictionaries consisting of quotations by Bierce and himself. The latter book has been referenced by IslamOnline, recommended by Cape Cod Times and he has been called "the Ambrose Bierce of our time" from AlterNet. Bufe is also a musician, and author of An Understandable Guide to Music Theory, now in its third edition. He translated the only English-language collection of the writings of Ricardo Flores Magón – Flores Magón Dreams of Freedom: A Ricardo Flores Magón Reader – and translated the Spanish language book Cuban Anarchism: The History of a Movement by Frank Fernández (writer) into English as well as Venezuela: Revolution as Spectacle, by Rafael Uzcategui.

Publications

Listen, Anarchist! 

Listen, Anarchist! is an influential 1987 essay by Bufe on the internal dynamics of the American anarchist movement.

In this essay, Bufe launches heavy criticism against anarcho-primitivists, including Fredy Perlman and the Vancouver Five eco-terrorist group, as well as the publications Fifth Estate,  Resistance, The Spark, and Open Road. In a section entitled "What Can Be Done?", Bufe advocates minimal use of violence in revolutionary political struggle, condemning the vanguardist "urban guerillas" of insurrectionary anarchism. He criticizes these and other so-called "lifestyle" anarchists in the movement for deliberately alienating mainstream society, and falling to victim to dangerous irrationality and mysticism.

In his account of "marginalised" anarchists, Bufe criticizes the anti-work tendency in contemporary anarchism, accusing some of its advocates of being parasites of those who do work. In response, Feral Faun wrote an article called "The Bourgeois Roots of Anarcho-Syndicalism" in which he claims that the endorsement of work showed that anarcho-syndicalists "embrace the values essential to capitalism", only objecting to who is in charge. The Summer 2005 issue of Green Anarchy included an "update on workerist morality", in which they characterised "Listen, Anarchist!" as Sam Dolgoff's Relevance and Murray Bookchin's "Listen Marxist!" poorly rewritten by Bufe to "shake his fist at all the young rapscallions who were throwing rocks at his perfect, beautiful philosophy."

In the introduction to the second edition, Janet Biehl proposes that many of the tendencies within anarchism that Bufe criticizes stem from its individualist wing, inspired by the philosophy of Max Stirner, which she maintains is the source of "lifestyle anarchists" who are at odds with the ethical socialist tradition of anarchism. Biehl criticizes the perceived lack of concern for morality among post-left anarchists such as Bob Black.

Allan Antliff described the work as "abusive", and said that its distribution by the Workers Solidarity Alliance belied the organisation's pretensions of anti-sectarianism. Mutualist Kevin Carson recommended the pamphlet as suggested reading for "getting from here to there".

Criticism

Bufe's "A Future Worth Living" and "Design Your Own Utopia" were critically reviewed by Bob Black in "Bufe Goof" and "Views From Nowhere", respectively.

References

External links
Bufe's See Sharp Press

Year of birth missing (living people)
Living people
Atheist
American atheists
American anarchists
American political writers
American male non-fiction writers